Roy James McCallum (born 12 April 1946) is a former South African rugby union player.

Playing career
McCallum, like his older brother Ian, matriculated at Rondebosch Boys' High School in Cape Town and attended the University of Cape Town. However, he first spent two years at Stellenbosch University before moving to UCT in 1967. While at Stellenbosch, he played for the University's under–19 A team and at UCT he played for their first team. In 1968, he went to Palmer College of Chiropractic in the United States to qualify as a chiropractor. He returned to South Africa and made his provincial debut for Western Province in 1972.

McCallum played only one test for the Springboks, the first test against the 1974 British Lions at Newlands in Cape Town and in his debut test, his brother was playing  fullback.  At the end of 1974 he toured with the Springboks to France, playing in four tour matches, scoring one try for the Springboks.

Test history

See also
List of South Africa national rugby union players – Springbok no. 462

References

1946 births
Living people
South African rugby union players
South Africa international rugby union players
Western Province (rugby union) players
Alumni of Rondebosch Boys' High School
University of Cape Town alumni
People from Kitwe
Rugby union scrum-halves